José Francisco Solano Júnior (born 10 April 1958), commonly known as Júnior Brasília, is a former Brazilian footballer . He was awarded the silver ball at the 1977 FIFA World Youth Championship for his performances.

References

Living people
Brazilian footballers
Brazil youth international footballers
Association football midfielders
CR Flamengo footballers
Cruzeiro Esporte Clube players
Mixto Esporte Clube players
Grêmio de Esportes Maringá players
Operário Futebol Clube (MS) players
Grêmio Esportivo Brasil players
Esporte Clube Rio Verde players
1958 births